Saburo Hamada (21 December 1892 – 10 November 1973) was a Japanese sculptor. His work was part of the sculpture event in the art competition at the 1932 Summer Olympics.

References

1892 births
1973 deaths
20th-century Japanese sculptors
Japanese sculptors
Olympic competitors in art competitions
People from Hakodate